Paskhan (also Romanized as Pāskhan, Pāsekhān, Pāskhān, and Pāsokhan; also known as Pāshkhān) is a village in Paskhan Rural District, in the Central District of Darab County, Fars Province, Iran. At the 2006 census, its population was 1,657, in 374 families.

References 

Populated places in Darab County